...And Millions Will Die! (aka "And Millions Die") is a 1973 Australian television film directed by Leslie H. Martinson. It was shot in Hong Kong.

Premise
Nazi war criminal Franz Kessler (Joseph Furst), a wealthy germ warfare expert living in Hong Kong, plants a gas-filled time bomb under the city sewers.

Cast
 Richard Basehart as Dr. Douglas Pruitt
 Susan Strasberg as Heather Kessler
 Peter Sumner as Dixie Hart
 Joseph Furst as Franz Kessler
 Alwyn Kurts as Dr. Mitchell
 Shariff Medan as Postman
 Leslie Nielsen as Jack Gallagher

Production
The film was a feature-length pilot for a proposed television series called "E-Force", about a crack environmental detective unit trying to track down those responsible for a poison gas attack. The villain Kessler was played by Viennese-born actor Joseph Furst, who was a regular on Australian TV and films. Make-up artist Patricia Glassup is the mother of the late INXS frontman Michael Hutchence.

References

External links

Australian television films
1973 television films
1973 films
1970s English-language films
Films shot in Hong Kong
1970s thriller films
Australian thriller films